Monika Eggens (born December 25, 1990) is a Canadian water polo player. She is a former student at the University of Hawaii. She currently plays for Olympiacos Piraeus and the Canada women's national water polo team.

In June 2021, Eggens was named to Canada's 2020 Summer Olympics team.

References

External links
 
 Monika Eggens at the 2015 Pan American Games

1990 births
Living people
Canadian female water polo players
Olympiacos Women's Water Polo Team players
Water polo players at the 2011 Pan American Games
Sportspeople from British Columbia
Pan American Games silver medalists for Canada
Pan American Games medalists in water polo
Water polo players at the 2015 Pan American Games
Water polo players at the 2019 Pan American Games
Medalists at the 2011 Pan American Games
Medalists at the 2015 Pan American Games
Medalists at the 2019 Pan American Games
Olympic water polo players of Canada
Water polo players at the 2020 Summer Olympics